John Jonke (born January 20, 1987 in Scarborough, Ontario) is a Canadian soccer player.

Career

College and Amateur
Jonke began playing soccer at the youth level during his secondary school years with St. Mary's Catholic Secondary School. In his senior year at St. Mary's Jonke was appointed team captain, and helped guide his team to the regional championship. When the season reached closure Jonke was awarded Player of the Year. In 2004 Jonke joined the Toronto Lynx youth academy, where he was appointed team captain and won the Heartland Division Championship. He also helped the U-19 Lynx squad reach the finals of the Dallas Cup where the Lynx were defeated 2-1 by IMG Soccer Academy. Soon after, Jonke was enrolled into the University of Louisville on a soccer scholarship. In his rookie season with the Cardinals he appeared in 22 matches and help strengthen the defence by recording eight shutouts. In his freshman season he recorded his first goal against Syracuse, and was able to establish himself as a starter.

In 2007 the Toronto Lynx announced the signing of Jonke for the 2007 PDL season. He made his Lynx debut on May 12, 2007 against the West Michigan Edge. The Lynx finished the season with a 6-6-4 record, which placed the team in fourth place in the Great Lakes Division, and only missed a playoff berth by six points. In 2008 Jonke helped the Lynx reach the playoffs for the first time since 2000, but unfortunately for the Lynx the Cleveland Internationals scored a late winner to take the game 2-1, sending the Lynx home early.

Professional
The following year Jonke turned professional when he signed with AC Oulu in Finland. He made his debut for AC Oulu on June 28, 2009 by scoring the winning goal in a 1-0 victory over FC KooTeePee.

After a year in Finland, Jonke returned to North America in early 2010 when he signed with Crystal Palace Baltimore of the USSF Division 2 Professional League. For the remainder of the 2010 season he signed with Portugal FC of the Canadian Soccer League. He recorded his first goal on July 23, 2010 in a match against London City. Jonke would help Portugal qualify for the playoffs by finishing fifth in the overall standings. In the first round of the postseason Portugal faced Milltown F.C., and advanced to the next round by winning the series by a score 3-2. In the semi-finals the club faced Brantford Galaxy, but were eliminated by a score of 5-3.

On March 7, 2011, Jonke signed with FC Edmonton of the second division North American Soccer League. In his debut season with Edmonton, he helped the team qualify for the postseason by finishing fifth in the overall standings. Edmonton faced the Fort Lauderdale Strikers in the postseason, but were eliminated by a score 5-0. In 2014, he signed with Vaughan Azzurri in the newly formed League1 Ontario.

International
Jonke was a member of the Canada U-20 men's national soccer team squad that took part in the 2005 Jeux de la Francophonie tournament. He made his Canada U-20 debut on December 6, 2005 against the Cameroon national football team. He would also appear in two other matches for Canada in their group stage, playing against Haiti, and Côte d'Ivoire, losing both matches which resulted in Canada being eliminated from the tournament.

Career statistics
(correct as of 18 March 2010)

Personal life
Jonke was born in 1987 to Frank and Joanne Jonke. His older brother, Frank Jr., is also a professional soccer player; he studied Major in Sports Administration alongside him at the University of Louisville, and also played with him at Oulu in Finland.

References

1987 births
Living people
AC Oulu players
Association football defenders
Canadian expatriate soccer players
Canadian soccer players
Canadian people of German descent
Crystal Palace Baltimore players
FC Edmonton players
Sportspeople from Scarborough, Toronto
Soccer players from Toronto
Toronto Lynx players
USL League Two players
USSF Division 2 Professional League players
North American Soccer League players
Canadian Soccer League (1998–present) players
SC Toronto players
Vaughan Azzurri players